Envelysin (sea-urchin-hatching proteinase, hatching enzyme, chorionase, chorion-digesting proteinase, chymostrypsin, sea urchin embryo hatching enzyme) is an enzyme. This enzyme catalyses the following chemical reaction

 Hydrolysis of proteins of the fertilization envelope and dimethylcasein

This enzyme is a glycoprotein from various members of the class Echinoidea.

References

External links 
 

EC 3.4.24